Double chess is a chess variant invented by Julian S. Grant Hayward in 1916. The game is played on a 16×12 chessboard with each player in control of two complete  armies placed side by side.

The rules were published in the January 1929 issue of British Chess Magazine.

Game rules
The illustration shows the starting setup. A player wins by checkmating either enemy king. Additional rules:
 Pawns have an initial up-to-four step option. En passant captures are permitted.
 A king may castle only on its own half of the board.

As in standard chess, pawns promote upon reaching the furthest .

Capablanca vs. Maróczy match

J. R. Capablanca, who had experimented with different forms of chess in the 1920s, found the game "remarkably interesting", and a four-game match was held with Géza Maróczy on 22–26 April 1929 at the Royal Automobile Club, Pall Mall, London. Capablanca won the match (202).

The only known  from the match is of the first game, having a time control requiring 30 moves per 90 minutes by each player:

White: Maróczy  Black: Capablanca 
1.i6 m10 2.h6 Nn10 3.Nc3 Nc10 4.Nn3 d8 5.m3 e8 6.Bl3 Bd10 7.d3 Be10 8.g5 Qd11 9.e4 0-0-0 10.Be3 f7 11.Qg4 g7 12.0-0-0 Nf10 13.Bfj5 Rdg12 14.Qh3 h8 15.Qm2 i7 16.Ni3 Ng8 17.h7 Ni9 18.Nge2 k8 19.k5 j7 20.Bjk4 Njk10 21.j5 g6 22.Ng4 Nj8 23.Bh4 Ne11 24.Bi5 Nl7 25.Bxd10 Qxd10 26.Qh2 Nl9 27.Bk2 Qo9 28.k6 Qxh2 29.Rxh2 Nj6 30.Bh1 jxk6 31.jxk6 Bh9 32.Ni5 Bef11 33.0-0 Nm7 34.Nl4 Bj8 35.Qo4 0-0 36.Bn7 Rij12 37.n6 Nml5 38.Rn5 Ql10 39.Rh4 Ql6 40.Qp4 Nj4 41.Nj5 Qn8 42.Rxj4 Qxn7 43.l5 Qn10 44.Rp5 p10 45.Ro4 Kp11 46.Bf4 Bl10 47.Bh2 Bn8 48.Nl6 Bj11 49.Bo6 Bxo6 50.Rxo6 l9 51.Ro8 m9 52.Rdh1 Rg10 53.Bg1 Qn9 54.R8o5 Ro10 55.Nn7 Rxo5 56.Rxo5 Bxg1 57.Np8 Qp9 58.Nxg1 (diagram) Nxl5 59.Rh4 Rj9 60.Rho4 Ro12 61.n7 Nxm3 62.Rm4 Nk2 63.Rk1 Rhj12 64.Rxk2 Rj1+ 65.Kn2 Rxg1+ 66.Kd2 Nk10 67.Qp7 Nl8 68.Qo7 n10 69.Rkm2 Nn9 70.Nxn9 Qxn9 71.Qn6 Rj11 72.Ko3 l8 73.Rn4 Qn8 74.Rn3 Ri1 75.Ne2 Ri3 76.Rmm3 Rxm3 77.Rxm3 Rj6 78.Nf4 Qh2 79.Nfh3 Ql2 80.Qn4 Bxk6 81.Nxk6 Rxk6 82.p4 Rk3 83.Rm5 Rj12 84.Kp2 Rxh3 85.Qi4+ l7 86.Qxh3 Qxf2+ 87.Kc3 Rj2 88.Ro3 Qc5+ 89.Kb3 Qxc2+ 90.Kb4 Qxb2+ 91.Kc4 Rc2+ 92.Kd5 Qb5+ 93.Kd4 Qc5

See also
 Tweedle Chess – a variant with two kings and two queens per side on a 10×10 board.

Notes

References

Bibliography

External links
 Double Chess by Hans Bodlaender, The Chess Variant Pages
 5619. Double Chess by Edward Winter, Chess Notes

Abstract strategy games
Chess variants
1916 in chess
Board games introduced in 1916